Dornice is a small settlement southwest of Vodice in the Upper Carniola region of Slovenia.

References

External links
Dornice on Geopedia

Populated places in the Municipality of Vodice